"The Love Song" is the fourth single by k-os from the album Joyful Rebellion. The string arrangements were done by Laura May Elston. The song gained some popularity in New Zealand, Greece and Portugal after being featured on a Vodafone television advertisement.

Music video
k-os walks across a desert and freestyle battles against an opponent. k-os walks to a monastery with breakdancing being studied and into a room with youngsters sitting on the floor watching a film educating them about the roots and beginnings of Hip Hop culture. The video ends with k-os walking off into the sunset with To Be Continued.

Desert scenes were filmed at Sandbanks Provincial Park on Lake Ontario.

Peak chart positions

References

External links

2005 singles
K-os songs
2005 songs
Virgin Records singles
Astralwerks singles